Yordan Apostolov (born 30 November 1989) is a Bulgarian footballer, currently playing as a midfielder for Balkan Botevgrad.

References

External links
 

1989 births
Living people
Bulgarian footballers
First Professional Football League (Bulgaria) players
FC Sportist Svoge players
PFC Belasitsa Petrich players
FC Etar 1924 Veliko Tarnovo players
PFC Lokomotiv Mezdra players
PFC Dobrudzha Dobrich players
PFC Marek Dupnitsa players
FC Botev Vratsa players
FC Lokomotiv Gorna Oryahovitsa players
SFC Etar Veliko Tarnovo players
FC Hebar Pazardzhik players
Association football midfielders